Dimiracetam is a nootropic drug of the racetam family, derivatives of which may have application in the treatment of neuropathic pain.

Legality

Australia 
Dimiracetam is a schedule 4 substance in Australia under the Poisons Standard (February 2020). A  schedule 4 substance is classified as "Prescription Only Medicine, or Prescription Animal Remedy – Substances, the use or supply of which should be by or on the order of persons permitted by State or Territory legislation to prescribe and should be available from a pharmacist on prescription."

References 

Racetams
Pyrroloimidazoles
Lactams